The Gulf Centre for Democratic Development (GCDD) is a training, information, and advocacy institution dedicated to promoting and nurturing democratic values in the Gulf Co-operation Council (GCC) countries as defined in the  International Bill of Human Rights. It is a non-governmental organization based in London, UK. Its current secretary-general is Dr Salah Al Bandar.

In September 2006, the GCDD issued a document revealing a political conspiracy within the government of Bahrain to marginalize its Shia population and rig the elections. The scandal became known as Bandargate.

See also
 Bandargate

External links
 GCDD website

Politics of Bahrain